Ervin Jeremiah Barker (June 2, 1883 – 1961) was an American athlete. He competed in the men's high jump at the 1904 Summer Olympics.

References

External links
 

1883 births
1961 deaths
Athletes (track and field) at the 1904 Summer Olympics
American male high jumpers
Olympic track and field athletes of the United States
People from Cresco, Iowa
Track and field athletes from Iowa
Olympic male high jumpers
Iowa Hawkeyes men's track and field athletes
Washington (state) lawyers
20th-century American lawyers
Date of death missing
Place of death missing